Foulden is a rural locality in the Mackay Region, Queensland, Australia. It is on the northern bank of the Pioneer River in Mackay.

Geography 
Foulden is bounded by the Pioneer River to the south and east, Fursden Creek to the north, and the Maraju Yakapari Road to the west. The land is low lying and flat and prone to flooding. The North Coast railway line and the Glenella Connection Road pass through the locality from south to north crossing the river on separate bridges (the road bridge being called the Edmund Casey Bridge) to West Mackay.

History 
The locality was named and bounded on 3 September 1999.

There was previously a bridge, known as the (Old) Hospital Bridge, which connected Talty Road in Foulden to Bridge Street in West Mackay (adjacent to the Mackay Base Hospital). It was the first bridge over the Pioneer River (and was originally known as the Pioneer Bridge). Construction commenced in 1875. The low bridge was prone to flooding. In April 2009 its replacement was open to the west of the Hospital Bridge carrying the newly constructed Glenella Connection Road over the Pioneer River. On 5 December 2009, the new bridge was named the Edmund Casey Bridge in honour of long-serving local Member of the Queensland Legislative Assembly, Ed Casey, as part of the Q150 celebrations. Local residents campaigned to retain the Old Hospital Bridge for recreational use such as walking, cycling and fishing, but the council insisted the costs of making it safe were too great and that only a short segment connected on the West Mackay side would be preserved as a fishing pier. However, in March 2017, Cyclone Debbie damaged the fishing pier., necessitating a new fishing pier to be built. The new pier will be L-shaped and more resistant to flood damage.

References 

Mackay Region
Localities in Queensland